Brigantiaea is a genus of lichen-forming fungi in the family Brigantiaeaceae. It was circumscribed by Italian botanist Vittore Benedetto Antonio Trevisan de Saint-Léon in 1853.

The genus name Brigantiaea honours Francesco Briganti (1802–1865), an Italian botanist and professor at the University of Naples.

Species
Brigantiaea fuscolutea 
Brigantiaea leprosa 
Brigantiaea leucoxantha 
Brigantiaea lobulata 
Brigantiaea lobulatisidiata 
Brigantiaea lordhowensis 
Brigantiaea mariae 
Brigantiaea microcarpa 
Brigantiaea phaeomma 
Brigantiaea sorediata 
Brigantiaea subobscurata 
Brigantiaea tricolor

References

Teloschistales
Teloschistales genera
Lichen genera
Taxa described in 1853
Taxa named by Vittore Benedetto Antonio Trevisan de Saint-Léon